Lino De Toni (born 18 October 1972) is an Italian ice hockey player. He competed in the men's tournament at the 1994 Winter Olympics.

References

External links
 

1972 births
Living people
Olympic ice hockey players of Italy
Ice hockey players at the 1994 Winter Olympics
Sportspeople from the Province of Belluno
SG Cortina players